Anderson Speedway is a quarter mile (400 m) high-banked paved oval racetrack in Anderson, Indiana, United States.

The track hosts the annual Little 500 sprint car race and the Redbud 400 stock car race. Weekly racing features several stock car divisions, Including: Minicups (also known as Supercups), Legends, Asphalt Late Models, Super Late Models, Street Stocks, Asphalt Sprint cars, and Winged Asphalt Sprint Cars. In 2021, midget races returned after ten years of absence.

The corners are banked at 17 degrees. The 2010 track record of 10.28 seconds in a winged sprint car was the world record for quarter-mile paved ovals until a sprint car driver qualified at Slinger Speedway in 9.909 seconds in August 2010.

Redbud 400
The premier stock car race at Anderson is the Redbud 400, a 400-lap super late model race held since 1967. It was sanctioned by the American Speed Association from 1969 to 1999 before the original tour ended. The race is part of the ARCA/CRA Super Series since 2001, and in 2023 it will be co-sanctioned by the new ASA STARS National Tour. Originally held in August, the event is currently held in mid July.

The quote, "It's like racing jet fighters in a gym", is attributed to noted short track driver Dick Trickle concerning racing ASA stock cars at the track.

Notable winners include Tiny Lund, Mark Martin, Alan Kulwicki, Dick Trickle, Kyle Busch, Daniel Hemric and Erik Jones.

Little 500
The track hosts the annual Pay Less Little 500 presented by UAW on the Saturday of the Memorial Day weekend, the night before the Indianapolis 500. At 500 laps, or 125 miles, the race is unusually long for sprint car races (typically races are between 10 and 50 miles), and is considered one of the premier wingless asphalt sprint car races. The field consists of 33 cars lined up in eleven rows of three, mimicking the traditional Indy 500 lineup. Many eventual Indy 500 drivers competed in the Little 500 over the years.  The 70th edition of the Pay Less Little 500 presented by UAW-GM paid out over $125,150 to the field.  The 72nd edition, held in 2020, was moved to September because of county governmental regulations.

In 2022, the race became part of the 500 Sprint Car Tour, a new ten-event pavement sprint tour at Anderson, Lucas Oil Raceway, Berlin Speedway (MI), and other stops. All races use identical specifications and share rules, except for the Little 500 with its formation (eleven rows of three).

Winners

1949 Sam Skinner
1950 Tom Cherry
1951 Red Renner
1952 Tom Cherry
1953 Bob King
1954 Tom Cherry 
1955 Tom Cherry
1956 Bob Cleberg
1957 Johnny White
1958 Wayne Alspaugh
1959 Ronnie Duman
1960 Ronnie Duman
1961 Jim McElreath
1962 Arnie Knepper
1963 Johnny White/Bob Coulter
1964 Dick Good
1965 Bob King/Chuck Taylor
1966 Rollie Beale
1967 Darl Harrison/Cy Fairchild
1968 Karl Busson
1969 Buzz Gregory
1970 Darl Harrison
1971 Herman Wise
1972 Jeff Bloom
1973 Dick Gaines
1974 Larry Dickson
1975 Darl Harrison
1976 Dick Gaines 
1977 Jeff Bloom
1978 Don Mack/Curt Kelley
1979 Wayne Reutimann/Danny Smith
1980 Bob Frey
1981 Greg Leffler
1982 Marvin Carman
1983 Marvin Carman
1984 Frank Riddle
1985 Frank Riddle 
1986 Dave Scarborough 
1987 Bob Frey 
1988 Bob Frey
1989 Bob Frey 
1990 Bob Frey
1991 Jeff Bloom
1992 Jim Childers 
1993 Eric Gordon
1994 Jim Childers
1995 Bentley Warren
1996 Dave Steele
1997 Bentley Warren 
1998 Eric Gordon
1999 Chet Fillip
2000 Jim Childers
2001 Eric Gordon
2002 Eric Gordon
2003 Eric Gordon
2004 Eric Gordon
2005 Eric Gordon
2006 Brian Tyler
2007 Eric Gordon
2008 Shane Cottle
2009 Dave Steele
2010 Eric Gordon
2011 Chris Windom
2012 Brian Tyler
2013 Jacob Wilson
2014 Jacob Wilson
2015 Chris Windom
2016 Kody Swanson
2017 Kyle Hamilton
2018 Kody Swanson
2019 Kody Swanson
2020 Bobby Santos III
2021 Tyler Roahrig
2022 Tyler Roahrig

References

External links
 Track website
 
 Anderson Speedway race results at The Third Turn

Buildings and structures in Anderson, Indiana
Motorsport venues in Indiana
Tourist attractions in Anderson, Indiana